20,000 Years of Fashion: The History of Costume and Personal Adornment is a dictionary of western fashion from ancient times up to the 1960s, edited by Francois Boucher and his longtime assistant Yvonne Deslandres.

The book is widely cited as a reference for fashion trends in paintings and has 1150 illustrations which are mostly paintings, etchings and engravings from Western museums and collections. The book includes a glossary of terms and a bibliography of sources. It was originally published in French in 1965 as Histoire du Costume en Occident de l’antiquité à nos jours and was translated into English the next year, but was published after Boucher's death. In 1987 Deslandres updated a new edition with a section on modern fashion.

References

 Book review in Publishers Weekly

1963 non-fiction books
20th-century history books
History of fashion